Grafman is a surname. Notable people with the surname include:

Jordan Grafman (born 1950), American neuropsychologist
Milton Grafman (1907–1995), American rabbi